Nehring is a surname. Notable people with the surname include:

 Alfred Nehring (1845—1904), German zoologist and paleontologist
 Ronald E. Nehring (1947–2019), American judge
 Walther Nehring (1892—1983), German World War II general

See also
 Nehring's blind mole-rat